Nutter may mean:

People 
 Nutter (surname)
 Nutter Thomas (1869-1954), Anglican Bishop of Adelaide, South Australia

Places 
 Nutter, Netherlands, a town
 Nutter Center, an entertainment arena near Dayton, Ohio, United States

Other 
 The Nutters, UK comic strip
 Britannia Coco-nut Dancers or Nutters
 Nutters of Savile Row, a tailor shop
 A fan of Scottish singer Paolo Nutini
 Nutter, British slang for a mad or eccentric person

See also
 Fluffernutter, a sandwich made with peanut butter and marshmallow fluff